Karyn Forbes (born 27 August 1991) is a Tobagonian footballer who plays as a midfielder for the Trinidad and Tobago women's national team.

International goals
Scores and results list Trinidad and Tobago' goal tally first.

References

External links 
 

1991 births
Living people
Women's association football midfielders
Trinidad and Tobago women's footballers
People from Tobago
Trinidad and Tobago women's international footballers
Pan American Games competitors for Trinidad and Tobago
Footballers at the 2011 Pan American Games
Footballers at the 2015 Pan American Games
Competitors at the 2010 Central American and Caribbean Games
Competitors at the 2018 Central American and Caribbean Games
College women's soccer players in the United States
West Texas A&M University alumni
Trinidad and Tobago expatriate women's footballers
Trinidad and Tobago expatriate sportspeople in the United States
Expatriate women's soccer players in the United States
Trinidad and Tobago expatriates in Iceland
Expatriate women's footballers in Iceland